The Kanektok River is a  stream in southwestern Alaska in the United States. Beginning in the Ahklun Mountains at Kagati and Pegati lakes, it flows westward into Kuskokwim Bay on the Bering Sea at the city of Quinhagak. Almost all of the river's course lies within the Togiak National Wildlife Refuge. The Quinhagak Village Corporation owns the land bordering the lowermost  of the river.

Recreation
The Kanektok River, varying from Class I (easy) to II (medium) on the International Scale of River Difficulty, is floatable by many kinds of watercraft. The upper reaches below Kagati Lake are sometimes too shallow for boats. Below this, swift currents, braided channels, logjams, and overhanging or submerged vegetation make the float "not a trip for beginners." In high water, the difficulty along the upper  of the river may increase to Class III (difficult).

Alaska Fishing describes the river as "one of Alaska's most celebrated salmon and trout streams". The main game fish are rainbow trout, char, Arctic grayling, king (Chinook), silver (Coho), chum, and red (sockeye) salmon. Anglers can float down from the headwaters
, hire a boat to go upriver from Quinhagak, or fish near tent camps and lodges along the lower river.

See also
List of rivers of Alaska
Togiak Wilderness

References

Rivers of Bethel Census Area, Alaska
Rivers of Alaska
Rivers of Unorganized Borough, Alaska